The 2019–20 Melbourne Renegades season was the ninth in the club's history. Coached by Michael Klinger and captained by Aaron Finch, they competed in the BBL's 2019–20 season.

Standings

Fixtures and results
Match 3

Match 7

Match 11

Match 15

Match 20

Match 22

Match 26

Match 30

Match 33

Match 37

Match 44

Match 47

Match 52

Match 56

Squad information
The following is the Renegades men squad for the 2019–20 Big Bash League season as of 24 January 2020.

Season statistics

Home attendance

References

External links
 Official website of the Melbourne Renegades
 Official website of the Big Bash League

Melbourne Renegades seasons